Sigeric was a Visigoth king for seven days in 415 AD.

Sigeric may also refer to:

 Sigeric, Burgundian prince, son of King Sigismund of Burgundy, died 517
 Sigeric of Essex, ruled 758-798
 Sigeric (archbishop), Archbishop of Canterbury, died 994